Maxim is an international technology company that operates taxi aggregation, food tech businesses, also offers additional services such as the delivery, cargo.

Maxim is among the world's leading ride hailing services.

History 
Since 2003, Maxim has been developing innovative technologies for ordering trips, cargo transportation, purchase and delivery, roadside assistance.

As of 2022, Maxim operates in more than a thousand cities in 18 countries worldwide. Kanpur in India became thousandth city of Maxim operation.

Countries of operation

Georgia 
Maxim started working in Georgia in 2014, and Tbilisi became the first city. By June 2022, the company's services can be used in 10 cities: Tbilisi, Rustavi, Batumi, Gori, Zestaponi, Zugdidi, Kobuleti, Kutaisi, Poti and Samtredia. In addition to trips, users can order cargo transportation, loader services, and in difficult traffic situations, use engine start and towing services. In July 2020, Maxim launched two tariffs: Courier for transportation of documents, packages and goods, and Shopping and delivery of goods, medicine and groceries.

Tajikistan 
Maxim started working in Tajikistan in 2017. In May, the first order was made in Khujand. Tajikistan became the sixth country where the company worked at that time. Users can make an order in the app, as well as the website or by phone. Maxim created its own contact center in Khujand, trained operators in the company's standards.

In September 2018, the company began operating in the capital of the country, Dushanbe, where it also opened a contact center.

December 4, 2020, in Dushanbe, the company launched the Karavan tariff for the transportation of small-sized cargo in cars have more cargo space. Also, in all 5 cities of operation, tariffs were launched for delivery and purchase of goods.

Kazakhstan 
Maxim started working in Kazakhstan in 2014. By March 2018, the company was operating in 11 cities: Aktobe, Almaty, Astana, Karaganda, Kokshetau, Kostanay, Petropavlovsk, Semey, Temirtau, Uralsk, Ust-Kamenogorsk. Now the services of the company can be used by residents and guests of 20 cities of the country.

Indonesia 
Maxim has been working in Indonesia since 2018. Users can order trips on a motorcycle, car, bentor, delivery and purchase of goods, cargo transportation, cleaning, and laundry. In December 2020, a new Massage and SPA tariff was launched.

In November 2021,  social insurance company PT Jasa Raharja provided basic traffic accident risk protection for Maxim users. Through this collaboration, both passengers and drivers receive compensation if experiencing any traffic accident. This collaboration aims to provide basic protection for the general public on the highway and is also a form of the state in providing protection to its people through Jasa Raharja. This is a mandatory program from the government to provide basic protection for traffic accident.

In December 2021, Maxim launched the Yayasan Pengemudi Selamat Sejahtera Indonesia charity fund provides financial support for passengers and drivers who are injured during rides. By October 2022, the payments amounted to more than 3 billion rupiah  for more 100 cases.

In December 2021, Maxim launched a marketplace integrated into the app. Users can order ready meals, food and other goods from partners directly.

In the first four years in Indonesia, Maxim expanded the area of operation to more than 100 cities across the country.

Malaysia 
Maxim has been working in Malaysia since the fall of 2018 and was actively expanding the operation area. By March 2020, the company was already operating in 35 cities.

Azerbaijan 
Maxim started working in Azerbaijan in 2017, the first city was Baku. The company is operating in 5 more cities of the country: Ganja, Sumgayit, Mingachevir, Lenkoran, Gabala.

Belarus 
Maxim started working in the country in May 2017. The first order was made in Vitebsk. By 2019, Maxim had already worked in 9 Belarusian cities. Residents and guests of which have an opportunity to use a modern and convenient service for trips by ordering in the app, on the website or by phone.

At this time Maxim launched a new tariff for shopping and delivery of goods, medicine and groceries. By October 2022, the company was already operating in 10 cities.

Philippines 
Maxim started working in the country in January 2020. It was first launched in Cebu. By January 2022, the company was already operating in 37 cities.

Colombia 
By July 2021, residents of the cities of Bucaramanga, Cucuta, Cali, Ibage and Pereira could order trips.

Peru 
By August 2021, the company was operating in 7 cities of the country: Сhiclayo, Chimbote, Cuzco, Huancayo, Piura, Trujillo, Lima. In these cities, Maxim offered users to order trips and delivery.

Brazil 
In 2021 Maxim started working in Brazil. By April 2022, the company has expanded an expansion to more than 30 Brazilian cities.

Turkey 
Since 2022 Maxim has been working in Turkey, the first city was Alanya.

Argentina 
Maxim currently works in two cities: Santa Fe, and Rosario.

Thailand 
Maxim started operating in Thailand in August 2022. The first order was performed in Chiang Mai. Since December 2022, Maxim is available in Pattaya.

References

External links

Transport companies established in 2003
Ridesharing companies